The 2021 FAI Women's Cup Final (known as The EVOKE.ie FAI Women's Cup Final for sponsorship reasons) was the final match of the 2021 FAI Women's Cup, the national association football Cup of the Republic of Ireland. The match took place on 21 November 2021 at Tallaght Stadium in Dublin. Wexford Youths and Shelbourne contested the match.

The match was shown live on RTÉ2 and RTÉ2 HD in Ireland, and via the RTÉ Player worldwide with commentary from Ger Canning and Lisa Fallon. It was refereed by Paula Brady, assisted by David Berry and Conor Fitzgibbon with Claire Purcell as Fourth Official. The 3,053 attendance was a record for a stand-alone women's final in Ireland.

Wexford Youths won 3–1 to secure the trophy for the fourth time in seven seasons and avenge their 5–0 defeat by Shelbourne in the 2016 final. Shelbourne, crowned League champions the previous week, missed the opportunity to claim a "double".

Match

Summary
On 31 minutes Shelbourne captain Pearl Slattery was cautioned for a foul by the centre circle, and when Shelbourne failed to clear the resultant free kick, Lynn-Marie Grant hoisted the ball high over goalkeeper Amanda Budden from the edge of the penalty area to give Wexford the lead. Shelbourne equalised on 39 minutes when Jessica Ziu's firm shot came back off the base of the post and fell to Ciara Grant who looped the ball in off the other post.

Five minutes into the second half, Wexford retook the lead. Player of the Match Ellen Molloy cut inside from the right and crossed to Kylie Murphy, who finished low past Budden from 12 yards (11m). Saoirse Noonan broke clear on 60 minutes, but Wexford full-back Orlaith Conlon made a last ditch tackle in which she injured her knee and had to be substituted. On 74 minutes Molloy was involved in Wexford's third goal, when after having a shot blocked she headed the ball to Edel Kennedy on the edge of the Shelbourne penalty area. Kennedy hit a powerful half volley past Budden to score the best goal of the game.

After their unexpected League title win the previous week, Shelbourne's players had partied until 7am at Tolka Park. Fatigue contributed their lacklustre performance in the Cup final. Although Wexford substitute Teegan Lynch had apparently not been listed in the matchday squad, Shelbourne declined to raise any complaint and instead congratulated their opponents: "the better team on the night".

Details

Notes

References

External links
RTÉ's full match coverage on RTÉ Player

Final
FAI Women's Cup finals
FAI Women's Cup Final